NNIT A/S is a Danish public IT company that provides IT consultancy, development, implementation and outsourcing of IT services to clients within life sciences in Denmark and internationally as well as to all types of customers in Denmark.

Its clients include among others Danish and international life science companies, public organizations, financial institutions and large enterprise companies. As of 2017, NNIT is currently the third-largest IT services provider in Denmark.

NNIT's more than 3,000 employees primarily work at the headquarters in Denmark and its offices in Asia, Europe and the USA.

The company was founded as Novo Nordisk IT in 1994 through the merger of Novo Nordisk's two existing information technology units. In 1999, Novo Nordisk IT was established as a private limited company, wholly owned by Novo Nordisk. In 2004, the company changed its name to the current NNIT A/S. In March 2015, NNIT was listed on the NASDAQ OMX.

History
The company was founded as Novo Nordisk IT in 1994 through the merger of Novo Nordisk's two existing information technology units. The company was converted into a wholly owned aktieselskab in 2004. In March 2015, NNIT was floated on the NASDAQ OMX Nordic, and has generally traded below the listing price due to lack of organic growth.

Activities
NNIT A/S offers IT solutions and services to customers within all customers segments, with a special focus on life sciences. NNIT A/S has more than 3,000 employees servicing a large number of international and local Danish customers. NNIT is headquartered  in Søborg, Denmark with sales offices in: Europe, United States and Asia. NNIT's primary offshore delivery center is in Manila, the Philippines. In addition, NNIT operates delivery centers in the Czech Republic and Poland.

Many of NNIT's customers operate in the life sciences sector, including NNIT's major customer, the Novo Nordisk Group, a world leading life sciences group, which comprises Novo Nordisk A/S and subsidiaries, but NNIT also provide services to customers in the public, enterprise and finance sectors, among these Arla Foods, PFA, Danske Bank, Digitaliseringstyrelsen, Nykredit and Rigspolitiet.''

See also
 Novo Nordisk
 Novozymes

References

 https://www.nnit.com/about-us/
 https://www.nnit.com/investors-media/investors/

Information technology companies of Denmark
Software companies based in Copenhagen
Companies based in Gladsaxe Municipality
Danish companies established in 1994